Stenobothrus festivus, commonly known as the festive toothed grasshopper,  is a species of insect in the family Acrididae. It is found in Portugal, Spain and France.

References

festivus
Insects described in 1887